Leptotes mayottensis is a butterfly in the family Lycaenidae. It is found on the Comoros in the Indian Ocean.

References

Butterflies described in 1958
Leptotes (butterfly)